Ahmet Fehim (1856, in Istanbul – 2 August 1930, in Istanbul) was a Turkish theater and film actor and director.

Filmography

Film

External links
 

Turkish male stage actors
1930 deaths
1856 births
Turkish male silent film actors
Male actors from Istanbul